Erase the Slate is the seventh studio album by American heavy metal band Dokken, released in 1999. It is the only Dokken studio album to feature former Winger guitarist Reb Beach and the last one with long-time bassist Jeff Pilson.

Track listing

Personnel
Dokken
Don Dokken - lead and backing vocals
Reb Beach - lead and rhythm guitars
Jeff Pilson - bass guitar, acoustic guitar, piano, mellotron, keyboards, backing vocals
Mick Brown - drums, lead vocals on "Crazy Mary Goes Round", backing vocals

Production
Rob Easterday - engineer
Wyn Davis, Michael Perfitt - additional engineering
Bernd Burgdorf, Scott Francisco, Wes Seidman - assistant engineers
Tom Fletcher - mixing
Rob Brill - mixing assistant
Gene Grimaldi, Tom Baker - mastering at Oasis Mastering, Studio City, California

References

Dokken albums
1999 albums
CMC International albums
SPV/Steamhammer albums
Mercury Records albums